Hadi Khorsandi (Persian: هادی خرسندی) is an Iranian poet and satirist. Since 1979, he has been the editor and writer of the Persian-language satirical journal Asghar Agha. He is known for his examination of Persian socio-political issues and for openly criticizing the Iranian regime. He has lived in exile in London since the 1979 Iranian Revolution.

Career 
Khorsandi first wrote for Tawfiq when he was a high school student in Tehran. He was the subject of death threats during the 1980s.

Hadi Khorsandi's latest book is Tafrih al-Masaael. His other books are Sheraaneh and Yaad Daasht-haaye Mashkouke Alam and Aayeh-haaye Iraani.

Personal life 
Khorsandi is the father of comedian Shaparak Khorsandi and journalist Peyvand Khorsandi.

See also

 Iranian stand-up comedy

References

External links

 www.HadiKhorsandi.Com
 Strange Times, My Dear: The PEN Anthology of Contemporary Iranian Literature
His poem

1943 births
Living people
Iranian emigrants to the United Kingdom
20th-century Iranian poets
Iranian satirists
Iranian stand-up comedians
Iranian democracy activists
Iranian editors
Iranian atheists
21st-century Iranian poets